Rubus audax, the Tampa blackberry, is an uncommon North American species of flowering plant in the rose family. It is found in scattered locations in the southeastern United States (Florida, Georgia, and the Carolinas).

The genetics of Rubus is extremely complex, so that it is difficult to decide on which groups should be recognized as species. There are many rare species with limited ranges such as this. Further study is suggested to clarify the taxonomy.

References

audax
Plants described in 1932
Flora of the Southeastern United States